Wudian may refer to the following locations in China:

 Wudian, Anhui (武店镇), town in Fengyang County
Written as "":
 Wudian, Guangshui, Suizhou, Hubei
 Wudian, Zaoyang, Xiangyang, Hubei
 Wudian, Shandong, town in Mudan District, Heze